Sumpit or sumpitan are general terms for blowguns, usually tipped with iron spearheads, used for hunting and warfare in the islands of the Philippines, Borneo, and Sulawesi. They were also known as zarbatana by the Spanish (Old Spanish variant of cerbatana, "lance").

Description
Sumpit were generally made from bamboo, but they can also be made from wood. They can be made from one piece or from two to three pieces joined. Sumpit used for war generally used thick wooden or palm leaf-rib darts. The blunt end of the dart is capped with a conical plug of soft cork-like wood or wrapped in feathers or  plant fiber which is dipped in resin to form an airtight seal when loaded.

The darts are too short to cause serious physical injury, thus when used in war or hunting large animals, they are dipped in a cup of poison before being loaded. The poison is made from the concentrated sap of the Antiaris toxicaria tree (variously known as upas, apo, or ipoh). The sap contains the toxin antiarin which can cause convulsions and death by cardiac arrest, even if the darts only cause minor injuries. Animals killed by these poison darts are safe to eat.

War sumpit also typically have iron spearheads attached on one end which allowed their use as spears once their ammunition is exhausted, similar in function to a bayonet. Sumpit used for hunting birds can also use clay pellets as ammunition.

The first written description of sumpit is from the accounts of Antonio Pigafetta in 1521, when he described the sumpit of the Palawan people of Palawan island.

Sumpit are traditional weapons of various ethnic groups in the Philippines, Borneo, and Sulawesi. The term is also used for toy blowguns in the Philippines.

Gallery

See also
Sibat
Luthang
Fire piston

References

Blowgun
Pneumatic weapons
Weapons of Indonesia
Weapons of the Philippines
Weapons of Malaysia